Mohd Badhri bin Mohd Radzi, P.S. (born 2 June 1982) is a Malaysian professional footballer who plays for Malaysian team Kelantan United and the Malaysia national team. Well known as Piya, Badhri is usually deployed as a central midfielder, but can also play as attacking midfielder and he is widely regarded as one of the greatest ever exponents of this position, due to his vision, ball control, creativity and passing ability, he is also a free-kick specialist. He also is the former captain of Kelantan. Badhri is Kelantan's most successful captain, having led them won two consecutive league titles and several domestic cups. He also was the captain of his team when they won all three major cups during 2012 season. Apart from that, he also led the team until last quarter in debut Kelantan during 2012 AFC Cup.

Began his football career in 2002 when he participated in Milo Kelantan team before being called to participate in Reserve League team in 2003 under coach Anizan Daud. Later in 2004, he has been promoted to play in Malaysian League before signed with Kelantan TNB FC for a season. In 2005, Badhri played for Kelantan JPS and helped his team win the FAM League and thus promoted for the Malaysia Premier League the next season. After a successful season with Kelantan JPS, Badhri signed with PDRM in 2007 and clinched the Malaysia Premier League champions on the same year.

Early life
Badhri was born and raised in Pengkalan Chepa near Kota Bharu in the state of Kelantan. He began actively playing football since the age of 10 playing for his school, Sekolah Kebangsaan Padang Garong in Kota Bharu. On the following year, he went to Sekolah Menengah Kebangsaan Putera in Kota Bharu. He wanted to be a footballer since he was a kid. His father is former Kelantan TNB player during the semi-pro era. His interest appeared to play football when he always watched his father's match during that time.

Club career

Kelantan JPS
Badhri made his senior debut with Kelantan-based club, Kelantan JPS. He played for the club during 2002 season. 2003, he played for Kelantan President Cup and went to final.

Kelantan TNB
Badhri made his senior career debut with Kelantan TNB in 2004 Malaysia Premier League. He scored 2 goals along that season and helped the team gain 5th place in the league. He played only for a season before moved to PDRM FA.

PDRM FA
In 2007, Badhri moved to Malaysia Premier League team PDRM FA and successfully helping the team emerge as champions of the 2006–07 Malaysia Premier League. PDRM FA was promoted to Malaysia Super League on the following year.

Kelantan

2007–2008 season
In 2008, at the age of 26, Badhri returned to his hometown and played for Kelantan FA. At that time being Kelantan was in second tier league of Malaysian football, Malaysia Premier League. During that time he played under coach Norizan Bakar and under  Khairul Anuar Ramli as the captain of the team. They obtained third place during that season and Badhri scored 9 goals along the season.

2009 season
In 2009, when first appointed as team captain, he refuse the offer because he feels that there is still other senior players that deserve it better. However, after making vote and head coach of the team himself insist wanting him. He finally accept the offer and officially become team captain starting that season. He was part of the team that lost to Selangor in 2009 Malaysia FA Cup final. Later on the season, he broke his leg during the match against Penang, consequently missed the 2009 Malaysia Cup final against Negeri Sembilan. It takes 7 months for him to recover from the injury.

2010 season
Badhri scored a winning goal in 2010 Malaysia Cup final match and brought home the cup for the first time in 89 years, after defeating defending champions Negri Sembilan. He scored the goal in the 65th minute from a lovely pass by Norfarhan Muhammad. He was selected as the 100 Plus most exciting player in the final game. During 2010 season, he scored 12 goals in 38 appearances. He manages to help the team gain 2nd place in the league behind Selangor.

2011 season
Badhri became the pillar of the team when Kelantan gain 1st place in 2011 Malaysia Super League season. Therefore, Kelantan had qualified to compete in 2012 AFC Cup for the first time. He scored 16 goals in 40 appearances along the season.

2012 season
Badhri has put his name on the scoreboard during his team biggest win of the season. Kelantan needed a simple win to clinch the crown but they went on a rampage thrashing Perak 6–0 at the Sultan Muhammad IV Stadium in Kota Bharu enough for the defending champions to top the league again, regardless of the outcome in their two remaining matches. Kelantan were simply in an uncompromising mood with inspirational midfielder Indra Putra in fiery form scoring a hat-trick in the 17th, 30th and 49th minutes. There was no stopping the team who raced to a comfortable 5–0 lead in the first-half. The other goals were scored by Mohammed Ghaddar in the 19th minute and Azwan Roya in the 38th minute.

In final match during Malaysia Super League campaign, against Sarawak Badhri opened the scoring as he scored his eighth goal of the season after swerving the ball into the net from a free kick. Another two goals came from Norfarhan Muhammad made Kelantan end the season in style. Kelantan won 3–1. Kelantan fans streamed into the Sultan Muhammad IV Stadium Kota Bharu to witness the historical moment of Badhri lifting up the much coveted Super League trophy after the game.

Badhri was a captain of the team, when Kelantan created history by lifting the FA Cup for the first time after a 22-year wait when they narrowly beat Sime Darby 1–0 in the final match at the National Stadium in Bukit Jalil.

Badhri made his debut in AFC Cup against Navibank Saigon on 7 March 2012. The match was held in National Stadium, Bukit Jalil. He played 90 minutes during the match that ended 0–0. Badhri has contributed to Kelantan's second goal against Arema with his corner from the left and glancing header by Mohammed Ghaddar. Kelantan won during that match 3–0. During AFC Cup quarter-finals first-leg match played at the Francouse Al-Hareeri Stadium, against Arbil, Badhri drew level from the spot kick in the 42nd minute for the half-time score 1–1. But the physically stronger Iraqis turned on the heat after the breather with goals from Amjed Radhi (penalty) in the 50th, Abdulhussein Ahmed in the 64th and substitute Salih Sader with a brace in the 70th and 90th minutes respectively. The match ended Arbil won 5–1.

During second-leg of Malaysia Cup semi-final against Selangor, Badhri scored second goal with a sublime free kick during injury-time. That match ended Kelantan won 3–0 on aggregate. Badhri has helped his team win the 2012 Malaysia Cup when he assisted all three goals against ATM.

2013 season
Badhri scored the first goal during Kelantan first 2013 Malaysia Super League match with a 2–1 victory over PKNS. During the final match of Group G of the 2013 AFC Cup Badhri scored a splendid goal straight from a corner kick. He sent a corner kick that went high over the goalkeeper before dipping into the far top corner of the goal. The match ended 3–1 to Kelantan and they advanced to the second round of the AFC Cup from the top spot of Group G.

During the 2013 Malaysia FA Cup Final, Badhri has made a beautiful pass to Nor Farhan to score Kelantan winning goal. He was selected as the man of the match in the final.

2018 season
On 15 November 2017, Badhri has extended his contract with Kelantan for another year. However, he was excluded from the first team, along with several other senior players, under new coach Fajr Ibrahim, and were announced by the management of Kelantan as free to join other teams in 2018.

International career
In July 2011, Badhri was called up to represent Malaysia Selection against Chelsea. Malaysia Selection was lost in that match 1–0 scored by Didier Drogba. In March 2013, Badhri finally selected into the Malaysia national team. He made his debut against Saudi Arabia in a FIFA 'A' friendly match on 17 March 2013 playing in the first half of the match.

Style of play
It is claimed that currently Badhri is one of the best midfielders in Malaysia. He possesses great footwork and is known for his precise passes in difficult situations, setting up his teammates for strikes on goal. He also has good dribbling skills. He has made numbers of goals through his free kicks, and has even scored goals directly from corner kicks.

Badhri's signature long pass, free kick and corner kick is nicknamed 'Gelembong Boya' by his fans, which loosely translate to 'The Alligator Curve'. It refers to the shape of the ball aerial path, and the deadly sudden downward speed of the ball, catching many goalkeepers off-guard.

Career statistics

Club

1 Includes Malaysia Charity Shield
2 Includes AFC Cup / AFC Champions League

International

Personal life

Business
Besides his hectic schedule as a professional footballer, Badhri still finds time to run his nasi lemak stall known as 'Ajihs Nasi lemak 80 sen' with partner Ramadhan Rosli in Kota Bharu. At first, he began the business as a part-time investment but fortunately it increasingly popular since the shop opened couple years back. His nasi lemak business is as hot as the Kelantan football team. During return-leg of the 2012 Malaysia Cup semi-final, Badhri lifted his jersey to reveal a T-shirt with the words 'Ajihs Nasi Lemak 80 sen' after scoring a late free kick goal against Selangor at the Shah Alam Stadium. The T-shirt is a hit among locals and has been put on sale at various stalls in Kota Bharu. His stall popular among his team-mates and locals. His stall currently situated in Jalan Guchil Bayam, Kota Bharu.

Hobbies
He has ultimate madness on collecting football boots and now his boots collection already hit 18 pairs. From Pro Spec, Puma, Nike to Adidas his boots collection always maintain and kept neat in the cupboard. Adidas F50 brand that sewn with name 'Piya 16' is the most expensive boots that he ever possessed.

Nicknamed 'Piya'
The name was given by one of his former coach, in reference to Colombia's legendary player at that time, Faustino Asprilla (pronounced Aspriyya). Since then, he was fondly known by his close friends as Piya. After taking the Kelantan captain's armband in 2009, 'Piya' has been regularly used name by Malaysian football pundits to refer to Badhri Radzi.

Honours

Club
Kelantan FA
 Malaysia Super League: 2011, 2012
 Malaysia FA Cup: 2012, 2013 Runner-up 2009, 2011, 2015
 Malaysia Cup: 2010, 2012 Runner-up 2009
 Malaysia Charity Shield: 2011 Runner-up 2012, 2013

PDRM FA
 Malaysia Premier League: 2006-07

Individual
 100PLUS-ASTRO ARENA-FAM National Football Awards: Winner for the Best Midfielder (2013 & 2014) and the Most Valuable Player of the season (2013).
 Goal.com's Asian Best XI for October 2012: Best Asian player for the month of October nominees.
 2013 Piala FA: Man of the match in the final
 Kelantan Young Leaders Award of 2013: Sports Personalities
 Goal Asia Team of the Month October 2013

References

External links
 Profile on theredwarriorsfc.com
 Player Summary Mohd Badhri Mohd Radzi
 Mohd Badhri Mohd Radzi at SoccerPunter.com
 
 
 

1984 births
Living people
People from Kelantan
Malaysian footballers
Malaysia international footballers
PDRM FA players
Kelantan TNB players
Kelantan FA players
People from Kota Bharu
Malaysia Super League players
Association football midfielders
Malaysian people of Malay descent
Kelantan United F.C. players